Good Game: The Transition is the fourth album by Saafir, an American hip hop musician. This album delves into deeper subject matter, but Saafir also maintains his usual style for which he is known.

Track listing
 "Crispy"
 "Cash Me Out"
 "One Of The Hardest"
 "In My Own Words"
 "Take Ya Time"
 Featuring Lady
 "Get Busy"
 "Devotion"
 Featuring Mike Marshall
 "Brand New"
 Featuring Mykytyn
 "The Technology"
 Featuring Nicaracci
 "Daddy's L.G."
 Featuring Lady
 "Hey Baby"
 Featuring Clever Jeff
 "I Hafto"
 "Jihad"
 Featuring Amir Suliaman

External links
 Saafir on MySpace
 ABB Records

2006 albums
Saafir albums